The 1983–84 Bowling Green Falcons men's ice hockey team represented the Bowling Green University in college ice hockey. In its 5th year under head coach Jerry York the team compiled a 34–8–2 record and reached the NCAA tournament for the fifth time. The Falcons defeated Minnesota–Duluth 5–4 in the fourth overtime to win the championship game at the 1980 Olympic Arena in Lake Placid, New York, the longest title game in NCAA history.

Season

Early season success
Bowling Green was champing at the bit after being left out of the 1983 Tournament despite winning the CCHA and having a better record than the team picked ahead of them, Minnesota–Duluth. The Falcons got off to a good start with a sweep of visiting Clarkson but when they opened their conference schedule the following week they could only manage a split with Lake Superior State. Losing to an inferior team appeared to galvanize the team and the Falcons proceeded to win the next 17 contests, the longest streak in program history. Through two months Bowling Green scored no fewer than 4 goals in each of their games and through they started out with Wayne Collins in net (their only goaltender with NCAA experience) Gary Kruzich soon became the go-to goalie. Even when Bowling Green was limited to 2 goals the defense showed up and allowed the Falcons to win the KeyBank Tournament. The streak finally ended with a 5–6 overtime loss at Michigan and a week later the team ended up with a tie against Ferris State.

Defensive cracks
The Falcons regained their footing when they played at home for the first time in over a month against Northern Michigan and after earning 3 points against Illinois–Chicago in early February Bowling Green guaranteed themselves their third consecutive CCHA title. With little to play for Bowling Green played a bad game against Western Michigan, allowing a season-high 8 goals against before earning a split. The following weekend they welcomed in Division III Michigan–Dearborn and dominated the obviously outmatched Wolverines but the lack of a challenge did not help BG right the ship and the squad split their final weekend against cellar-dwelling Miami.

CCHA tournament
With the program record for wins in sight (37) the team appeared to get back to normal when they opened the tournament with a home win against Lake Superior State but they were back in the losing column after game 2. Fortunately the first round was a total-goal series and the close loss in the second game didn't cost BGSU too much. In the semifinal at the Joe Louis Arena Bowling Green faced Western Michigan and the Broncos showed no fear in facing down the Falcons and the two teams fought to a 3–3 tie through regulation. Kruzich kept the Falcons in the game but future NHLer Glenn Healy couldn't be beaten and in the second overtime WMU scored to end Bowling Green's chance at the conference championship. The Falcons had a chance to redeem themselves in the consolation game but against fell in overtime, this time to Ohio State.

NCAA tournament
Even with losing three consecutive games Bowling Green still had the second best record in the country and the selection committee gave them an at-large bid, slotting them third in the west. As a lower seed, BGSU started the tournament on the road against Boston University and the Falcons still could not break out of their losing skid, dropping the game 3–6. With the team needing to win the second game by 4 goals to advance they had their work cut out for them but Gary Kruzich played one of his best games, holding BU to a single goal while the Falcons scored 4 goals in regulation, and added the series winner in overtime.

The miraculous turnaround sent Bowling Green to Lake Placid for the second time that season where the Falcons faced the #1 offensive team and the only squad with more wins (33), Michigan State. Once more the defense was instrumental in Bowling Green's win, shutting the Spartans down and winning 2–1.

Overtime Epic
In the championship game BGSU only had Minnesota–Duluth left standing in their way but the #1 ranked Bulldogs looked to be a tough test. Bristling with talent and possessing Hobey Baker Award winner Tom Kurvers, UMD looked to get the jump on Bowling Green early but it was Garry Galley who notched the game's first goal with a shot that somehow found its way through a mass of bodies. Duluth responded with their own goal 20 seconds later and two teams remained tied for the next period plus. Bill Watson broke the tie past the mid-way point of the game while Bob Lakso extended the lead at the start of the third period. With the team down by 2 goals with 19 minutes to play, Bowling Green began firing shot after shot against Rick Kosti and eventually the Falcons' leading goal-scorer Jamie Wansborough broke through with a power play marker. With over 15 minutes to play the Falcons had plenty of time to tie the score but with Duluth playing in a defensive shell their opportunities were limited. The situation became dire when UMD regained their 2-goal advantage with 8 minutes to play but the Falcons responded immediately and cut the lead back to 1. Bowling Green had a good opportunity to tie the game late on a power play but they couldn't convert and as the clock kept ticking it appeared that Minnesota–Duluth was going to win the national title. With less than two minutes to play, team co-captain Wayne Wilson fired the puck into the Duluth zone from the red line. When Kosti went behind the net to play the puck it hit something along the boards and bounced out into the crease and, with three Bulldogs around him, John Samanski poked the puck into the net to tie the game.

With the Duluth faithful screaming that the play should have been icing the two teams restarted play and fought furiously in the final 90 seconds before heading into overtime. In the first overtime UMD nearly ended the game but Kruzich stopped a semi-breakaway by Lakso and neither squad could find the back of the net. The game became the first title game to need more than one extra frame but it did not stop there. Kruzich and Kosti kept the score tied until deep into the fourth 10-minute overtime. With both teams exhausted leading BG scorer Dan Kane found Gino Cavallini alone in front of the net and the sophomore backhanded the puck past Kosti's leg to end the longest championship game in NCAA history (as of 2019).

Awards and honors
Gary Kruzich became the third consecutive goaltender to win the tournament MOP as much for his overtime heroics as for holding BU and MSU to single goals in the previous two wins. However, Kruzich had to share his All-Tournament team spot with UMD's Rick Kosti, the only time in history that any position was split between two people (as of 2019). Kruzich was joined on the All-Tournament team by David Ellett and Garry Galley while Galley and Dan Kane made the AHCA All-American West Team and the All-CCHA First Team Ellett and John Samanski were named to the CCHA Second Team while none of the individual conference awards went to the Falcons.

The championship was the first for any CCHA team and demonstrated that the conference could compete with the other major powers of the college hockey world.

Standings

Schedule

|-
!colspan=12 style=";" | Regular Season

|-
!colspan=12 style=";" | 

|-
!colspan=12 style=";" | 

|- align="center" bgcolor="#e0e0e0"
|colspan=12|Bowling Green Wins Series 13–10

|-
!colspan=12 style=";" | 

|- align="center" bgcolor="#e0e0e0"
|colspan=12|Bowling Green Wins Series 8–7

Roster and scoring statistics

Goaltending statistics

1984 championship game

(W2) Minnesota–Duluth vs. (W3) Bowling Green

Players drafted into the NHL

1984 NHL Entry Draft

† incoming freshman

See also
1984 NCAA Division I Men's Ice Hockey Tournament
List of NCAA Division I Men's Ice Hockey Tournament champions

References

Bowling Green Falcons men's ice hockey seasons
Bowling Green
Bowling Green
Bowling Green
Bowling Green
Bowling Green
Bowling Green